Jim or Jimmy Armstrong may refer to:

Jimmy Armstrong (footballer, born 1899) (1899–1971), played for Barnsley, Bournemouth, Chester-le-Street and Stalybridge Celtic
Jimmy Armstrong (footballer, born 1901) (1901–1977), played for Chelsea, Tottenham, Luton and Bristol Rovers
Jimmy Armstrong (footballer, born 1904) (1904–1971), played for Clapton Orient, QPR and Watford
Jim Armstrong (wrestler) (1917–1981), Australian Olympic wrestler and rugby league player
Jim Armstrong (guitarist) (born 1944), Northern Ireland guitarist
Jim Armstrong (curler) (born 1950), Canadian and wheelchair curler from British Columbia
Jim Armstrong (sports journalist), sportswriter for the Denver Post

See also
James Armstrong (disambiguation)